Marcus Popp (born 23 September 1981 in Flöha) is a German volleyball player.

References 
 Profile (German)

External links 
 Marcus Popp at the International Volleyball Federation
 
 
 

1981 births
Living people
People from Flöha
German men's volleyball players
Volleyball players at the 2008 Summer Olympics
Volleyball players at the 2012 Summer Olympics
Olympic volleyball players of Germany
Sportspeople from Saxony
Tours Volley-Ball players